Budai II. Laszló Stadion is a multi-use stadium in Budapest, Hungary.  It is currently used mostly for football matches and is the home stadium of Rákospalotai EAC and 1. FC Femina. The stadium was named after Rákospalota-born Hungarian footballer, László Budai. The stadium is able to hold 10,000 people.

Photo gallery

External links
Stadion Budai II. László at magyarfutball.hu

See also
 List of Nemzeti Bajnoksag I stadiums

Football venues in Hungary
Sports venues in Budapest